Beyond , the terminus that is accessible to the public, there are two other stations on Line 1, Beijing Subway.

53# station is located under a military base, therefore rendering them inaccessible to the public.

 station is under renovation.

Fushouling station (No. 102) 

 station, previously known as 52# station, is currently under renovation. It is the second last station of Line 1, Beijing Subway. On 25 November 2021, the station began renovation. It is expected that the station will open in 2023. The station will also serve the nearby Beijing Banking & Insurance Business Park (北京银行保险产业园).

53# station (Gaojing station, No. 101) 

53# station, also known as Gaojing by Shijingshan District Government, is located under a military base. There are two side platforms with space for two tracks, one of which (facing ) has been left unbuilt.

Connection to Sanjiadian railway station 
After 53# station, there is a spur to the Sanjiadian railway station in Mentougou District, also located in Beijing's Western Hills.

See also 
 Line 1, Beijing Subway
 Beijing Subway
 List of Beijing Subway stations
 Rail transport in the People's Republic of China
 Ghost station

References

External links 
 
 
 Comprehenshive site about the restricted stations of Line 1 

Beijing Subway stations